The Franchise Affair is a British television series which originally aired on BBC One in 1988. It is based on the 1948 novel The Franchise Affair by Josephine Tey.

Main Cast
 Patrick Malahide as Robert Blair
 Joanna McCallum as  Marion Sharpe
 Rosalie Crutchley as Mrs. Sharpe
 Miranda Bell as Miss Tuff
 David Ellison as  Inspector John Hallam
 James Garbutt as Mr. Heseltine
 Alex Jennings as Nevil Bennet
 Penelope Nice as Mrs. Wynn
 Grant Parsons as  Leslie Wynn
 Timothy Block as Stanley Peters
 Kate Emma Davies as  Betty Kane
 Jean Heywood as Aunt Lin
 John Vine as Det. Insp. Grant
 Edward Wilson as  Benjamin Corley
 David Doyle as Wallis
 Peter James Holloway as Herbert
 Jo Rowbottom as  Mildred Pinner
 Catherine Terris as  Anita Kenton
 Roger Brierley as  Ramsden

References

Bibliography
Baskin, Ellen . Serials on British Television, 1950-1994. Scolar Press, 1996.

External links
 

BBC television dramas
1988 British television series debuts
1988 British television series endings
English-language television shows
Television shows based on British novels